Trixis is a genus of shrubs in the family Asteraceae, native to North and South America including the West Indies.

Members of the genus are commonly known as threefolds due to the outer lip of the corolla.

 Species
 Trixis aggregata Rusby -  Bolivia 
 Trixis alata D.Don - Guerrero, México State, Guanajuato 
 Trixis angustifolia DC. - San Luis Potosí  
 Trixis anomala B.L.Turner - Chiapas 
 Trixis antimenorrhoea (Schrank) Mart. ex Baker - South America 
 Trixis bowmanii Baker - Brazil 
 Trixis cacalioides (Kunth) D.Don - Peru 
 Trixis calcicola B.L.Rob. - Guerrero 
 Trixis californica Kellogg – American threefold -  USA (CA AZ NM TX), Mexico (Baja California, Baja California Sur, Sonora, Chihuahua, Coahuila, Durango, Zacatecas, Nuevo León) 
 Trixis chiapensis C.E.Anderson - Guatemala, Chiapas 
 Trixis erosa Sw. - Costa Rica, West Indies 
 Trixis glaziovii Baker - Paraná, Rio de Janeiro 
 Trixis grandibracteata C.E.Anderson - Guerrero  
 Trixis grisebachii Kuntze - Bolivia, northern Argentina 
 Trixis haenkei Sch.Bip. - Durango, Sinaloa 
 Trixis hassleri Chodat - Paraguay  
 Trixis hyposericea S.Wats. - Jalisco, Michoacán, Nayarit 
 Trixis inula Crantz – Tropical threefold - USA (TX), Mexico, Central America, West Indies, Colombia, Venezuela 
 Trixis lessingii DC. - Paraguay, Uruguay, Brazil 
 Trixis longifolia D.Don - México State, Sinaloa 
 Trixis megalophylla Greenm. - México State, Oaxaca, Puebla 
 Trixis mexicana Lex. - Michoacán 
 Trixis michuacana Lex. - Michoacán, Jalisco, Nayarit 
 Trixis nelsonii Greenm. - Guatemala, Chiapas, Oaxaca 
 Trixis nobilis (Vell.) Katinas - Paraguay, Uruguay, Brazil, Argentina 
 Trixis ophiorhiza Gardner - Bolivia, Brazil 
 Trixis pallida Less. - Paraguay, Uruguay, Brazil, Argentina 
 Trixis parviflora C.E.Anderson - Oaxaca 
 Trixis peruviana Katinas - Peru 
 Trixis praestans (Vell.) Cabrera - Paraguay, Uruguay, Brazil, Argentina 
 Trixis pringlei B.L.Rob. & Greenm. - Guerrero, Oaxaca 
 Trixis proustioides Hieron. - Colombia  
 Trixis pterocaulis B.L.Rob. & Greenm. - Colima, Jalisco, Nayarit, Sinaloa, Sonora 
 Trixis silvatica B.L.Rob. & Greenm. - Oaxaca 
 Trixis spicata Gardner - Paraguay, Uruguay, Brazil 
 Trixis thyrsoidea Dusén ex Malme - southern Brazil 
 Trixis vauthieri DC. - eastern Brazil 
 Trixis verbascifolia (Gardner) S.F.Blake - Minas Gerais, Rio de Janeiro 
 Trixis villosa (Spreng.) Sch.Bip. - Brazil

 Formerly included
Numerous species once included in Trixis but now considered better suited to other genera: Acourtia Clibadium Dolichlasium Holocheilus Perezia Riencourtia

References

External links

 
Asteraceae genera